The 502d Air Operations Group in an inactive United States Air Force unit.  It was last active in October 2006 at Hickam Air Force Base, Hawaii, where it had served as the umbrella for intelligence and operational support units under Pacific Air Forces

The unit was first activated as the 502nd Tactical Control Group in December 1945.  In 1950 it was rushed to Korea where it fought in the Korean War, earning two Presidential Unit Citations for its actions during the war.  It continued to serve under Far East Air Forces after the war until it was inactivated in October 1957.

History
At the beginning of the Korean War, the United States Air Force's only tactical control group was the 502d at Pope Air Force Base, North Carolina. To meet the emergency in the theater, Fifth Air Force organized the 6132d Tactical Air Control Squadron, which established a full-scale Tactical Air Control Center at Taegu Air Base, South Korea on 23 July 1950.

Less than three months later, the 502nd and its subordinate squadrons moved from Pope to Korea.  In October 1950 the 502d replaced the 6132nd in the mission of directing tactical air operations in Korea. Through its 605th Tactical Control Squadron, the group operated the Tactical Air Control Center and worked with the United States Army in a Joint Operations Center. The group's two aircraft control and warning squadrons operated Tactical Air Direction Centers, which used stationary and mobile radar and communications equipment to guide aircraft on close air support missions. In November a third aircraft control and warning squadron was activated to reinforce the group.

The group also deployed Tactical Air control Parties, which accompanied ground units to communicate with strike aircraft. These small detachments followed advancing United Nations troops into North Korea in October and November 1950, but the Chinese Communist offensive soon overran several of them. The 502d's headquarters and the Tactical Air Control Center, which had been operating from Seoul in November and part of December, were forced to return to Taegu.

During the spring and summer of 1951, the 502d directed night bombing of enemy targets, including troop concentrations, supply dumps, and motor convoys. As United Nations ground forces drove the enemy back across the 38th Parallel, the group returned to Seoul in June, along with the Tactical Air Control Center and the Joint Operations Center returned to Seoul. In October, the 502nd set up a communications station 100 miles behind enemy lines on Cho-do Island, three miles off the North Korean coast. From this location the detachment guided fighter aircraft against enemy airplanes in MiG Alley, bombers against strategic targets along the Yalu River, and search and rescue aircraft toward survivors who had ditched at sea.

On 6 June 1952, the 502nd was instrumental in the destruction of nine Mikoyan-Gurevich MiG-15 aircraft by directing North American F-86 Sabres to maneuver into a position from which they could advantageously attack the MiGs.  In addition, during 1952, Detachment 2 of the 608th Squadron was credited with the first (and possibly the only) confirmed kill of a multi-engine enemy bomber. The following month, the 502nd guided warplanes in attacks on enemy troop formations that blunted communist offensives until the Korean Armistice Agreement was signed in July 1953.

Lineage
 Constituted as the 502d Tactical Control Group
 Activated c. 15 December 1945
 Inactivated on 1 October 1957
 Redesignated 502d Air Operations Group
 Activated on 27 October 2000
 Inactivated on 6 October 2006

Assignments
 Continental Air Forces, c. 5 December 1945
 Tactical Air Command, c. 21 March 1946
 Ninth Air Force, 31 March 1946
 Fourteenth Air Force, February 1949
 Tactical Air Command, 1 September 1950
 Fifth Air Force, 1 October 1950
 314th Air Division, c. March 1955 – 1 October 1957
 Pacific Air Forces, 27 October 2000 – 6 October 2006

Components
 Center
 Pacific Air Forces Air Mobility Operations Center: 27 October 2000 – 6 October 2006

 Squadrons
 26th Air and Space Intelligence Squadron: 27 October 2000 – 6 October 2006
 56th Air and Space Plans Squadron: 27 October 2000 – 6 October 2006
 56th Air and Space Operations Squadron: 27 October 2000 – 6 October 2006
 502d Air Operations Squadron: 27 October 2000 – 6 October 2006
 605th Tactical Control Squadron: 15 December 1945 – 1 October 1957
 606th Tactical Control Squadron (later 605th Aircraft Control and Warning Squadron), 15 December 1945 – 1 October 1957 (attached to Tactical Air Force, Provisional August 1949 – August 1950, Fourteenth Air Force, August 1950 – September 1950: Far East Air Forces, September 1950 – October 1950)
 607th Tactical Control Squadron (later 605th Aircraft Control and Warning Squadron): 15 December 1945 – 1 October 1957
 608th Aircraft Control Squadron (later 608th Aircraft Control and Warning Squadron, 608th Tactical Control Squadron): 5 December 1945 – 28 March 1949, 2 November 1951 – 1 October 1957
 6132d Aircraft Control and Warning Squadron: 9 October 1950 – 2 November 1951
 1st SHORAN Beacon Unit (later 1st SHORAN Beacon Squadron): attached 27 September – 1 December 1950 and 6 September 1952– unknown

Stations
 Biggs Field, c. 15 December 1945
 Greenville Air Force Base, South Carolina, January 1947
 Shaw Air Force Base, South Carolina, 1948
 Pope Air Force Base, North Carolina, 27 June 1949 – 27 August 1950
 Pusan Air Base, South Korea, September 1950
 Taegu Air Base, South Korea, October 1950
 Seoul, South Korea, November 1950
 Taegu Air Base, South Korea, 6 December 1950
 Seoul, South Korea, June 1951
 Osan Air Base, South Korea, January 1954 – 1 October 1957
 Hickam Air Force Base, Hawaii, 27 October 2000 – 6 October 2006

Awards and campaigns

See also
 United States Air Force in South Korea
 List of United States Air Force Groups

References

Notes

Citations

Bibliography

 
 
  Part 1, Part 2 Part 3 Part 4
 

Air control groups of the United States Air Force
Air operations groups of the United States Air Force
Military units and formations of the United States in the Cold War